John R. Gordy II is a United States Air Force major general who most recently was the assistant deputy under secretary for international affairs. He previously commanded the United States Air Force Expeditionary Center.

He is set to retire from active duty.

References

Living people
Place of birth missing (living people)
Recipients of the Air Force Distinguished Service Medal
Recipients of the Defense Superior Service Medal
Recipients of the Legion of Merit
United States Air Force generals
United States Air Force personnel of the Iraq War
Year of birth missing (living people)